Old Town, California may refer to:
Old Town, Kern County, California
Old Town, Marin County, California
Old Town, Santa Barbara County, California
Old Town, Ventura County, California
Old Town, California, former name of Pine Town, California, in Lassen County

See also
 Old Town Eureka
 Old Town Pasadena
 Old Sacramento State Historic Park
 Old Town San Diego State Historic Park